The 37th Guards Rifle Division was an infantry division of the Red Army which fought during World War II.

The division was formed on 2 August 1942 from the 1st Airborne Corps in Lyubertsy, near Moscow. Its most famous action was the defense of the Stalingrad Tractor Factory during the Battle of Stalingrad. The division was highly decorated, receiving two Orders of the Red Banner, the Order of Suvorov 1st class, the Order of Kutuzov 1st class and the Order of Bogdan Khmelnitsky. It became the 27th Guards Mechanised Division in  December 1945 and on 20 April 1957 the 39th Guards Tank Division at Polotsk (Borovukha), Vitebsk Oblast, Belorussian Military District. On 1 January 1965 it became the 37th Guards Tank Division, staying within 7th Tank Army for the duration. In 1992 it became part of the Belarus Ground Forces. The tank division was converted to the 37th Separate Guards Mechanized Brigade, which was disbanded in fall 2011. The division's lineage currently exists as the 37th Weapons and Equipment Storage Base of the North Western Operational Command at Polotsk.

History 
The 37th Guards Rifle Division was formed on the basis of the personnel of the 1st Airborne Corps at Lyubertsy on 2 August 1942. The 1st Airborne Brigade became the 109th Guards Rifle Regiment, the 204th Airborne Brigade became the 114th Guards Rifle Regiment and the 211th Airborne Brigade became the 118th Guards Rifle Regiment.

Stalingrad 
The division was sent to the Stalingrad Front and became part of the 4th Tank Army on 10 August. On the night of 14 August, the division was unloaded from trains at Ilovlya station, with the task to take defensive positions in a small bend in the Don near the village and hamlets of Trehostrovskoy and Zimoveysky, but did not have time to gain a bridgehead. Instead, the division went directly to the right bank of the river and defended that area, disrupting German attempts to cross the Don. On 18 September, elements of the division crossed the Don and established a bridgehead. The division handed over the defense of the area to the 22nd Motorized Rifle Brigade and crossed the Volga River 40 km north of Stalingrad on 28 September.

On the night of 2 October, the division crossed back to the right bank of the Volga in Stalingrad and reached the Mokraya Mechyotka river, immediately going into combat. The intensity of the fighting can be gauged from the memoirs of a surgeon in the division, M.F. Gulyakin. Gulyakin reports that rarely were there less than 200 wounded troops per day. By 14 October the remnants of the division were surrounded in the workshops of the Stalingrad Tractor Factory. The 14th Panzer Division broke through parts of the division's lines and reached the Volga. During the night of 16–17 October it was relieved by the 138th Rifle Division and sent to the Barrikady Factory, where the division set up strongpoints. In the middle of November, the division transferred to the left bank of the Volga, leaving in Stalingrad a combined unit based on the 118th Guards Rifle Regiment, subordinated to the 138th Rifle Division. After a few days, the combined unit was withdrawn due to heavy losses. The division was almost completely destroyed in the fighting for the Stalingrad Tractor Factory. Losses amounted to 95% of division personnel.

Sevsk Offensive 
A Stavka directive ordered the division to withdraw from the Stalingrad Front reserves on 27 December. It was meant to board trains at the station of Zaplavnaya at 1800 on 25 December and sent to Balashov, but only departed on 31 December. On 6 February 1943, it was directed that the division be sent to the Central Front after being rebuilt to fight in the Sevsk offensive. On 17 February, the division unloaded at Yelets station. The division reportedly advanced 260 kilometers in eight days. It joined battle with German troops at Gladkoye and Veretenino. They met resistance from elements of the 137th Infantry Division but continued to advance. On the line of Chernevka, Gladkoye and Koshkino, the 137th, reinforced by the SS tanks, attempted to hold back the advance. The division captured Gladkoye, Koshkino and Studensky. During the capture of Koshkino, the 3rd Battalion of the 114th Guards Rifle Regiment was particularly distinguished. The division continued to advance and stopped at the villages of Nevar, Prudnoye and Khlebtovo. On 28 April, the division was awarded the  Order of the Red Banner for its performance at Stalingrad.

Operation Kutuzov and the Dnieper 
The division fought in Operation Kutuzov in August as part of the 65th Army's 18th Rifle Corps. On 12 August, the division helped captured Dmitrovsk in cooperation with other units. The division then crossed the Desna River and the Sozh River in September, fighting in the Chernigov-Pripyat Offensive. It fought to expand the Sozh bridgehead until mid-October. During the offensive, telephonist Vasily Bantsekin distinguished himself, for which Bantsekin was posthumously awarded the title Hero of the Soviet Union on 15 January 1944. Machine gun company private Ivan Mokrousov also distinguished himself and was awarded the title Hero of the Soviet Union. On 20 October, the division was transferred to cross the Dnieper northwest of Loyew. 118th Guards Rifle Regiment company commander Lieutenant Vladimir Vladimirov distinguished himself during the Dnieper crossing, for which he was awarded the title Hero of the Soviet Union posthumously. 109th Guards Rifle Regiment company commander Senior Lieutenant Nikolay Shchetinin also distinguished himself and was awarded the title Hero of the Soviet Union on 15 January 1944. During November, it fought in the Gomel-Rechitsa Offensive. The division was awarded the title "Rechitsa" on 18 November for its actions during the capture of Rechitsa in conjunction with the 162nd Rifle Division. During December 1943 and January 1944, the division fought to capture southeastern Belarus. It reportedly distinguished itself in the battles near Kalinkovichi and Mazyr, for which it was awarded the Order of Suvorov 2nd class on 15 January.

Operation Bagration and the Narew Bridgehead 
During Operation Bagration in the summer, the division broke through German defenses at Babruysk and helped capture Osipovichi on 28 June. The division was awarded a second   Order of the Red Banner on 2 July for its actions at Babruysk. It then captured Baranovichi on 8 July and Slonim on 10 July. The division was awarded the Order of Kutuzov 1st class for its actions during the capture of Baranovichi. After the capture of Belarus, the division entered Polish territory and reached the Narew at the beginning of September. The division crossed the Narew south of Pułtusk and until January fought to hold the bridgehead.

East Pomeranian Offensive and the Berlin Offensive 
On 13 January, the division attacked out of its bridgehead. By the end of January, the division had reached Graudenz and besieged the city. It was transferred to the 2nd Shock Army on 14 February. On 16 February, it attacked the city again but was unable to capture the city itself. On the night of 18 February, the division attacked again but was forced to retreat due to strong German resistance. However, these attacks had worn down the German troops to allow elements of the 142nd Rifle Division to capture the city.  It returned to the control of the 65th Army on 2 March and fought in the East Pomeranian Offensive. It then advanced on Danzig and fought in the street fighting in the city. During the fight, division commander Sobir Rakhimov was killed on 26 March by a direct hit on his observation post. Major general Kuzma Grebennik took command on 30 March, replacing Colonel Nikolai Onoprienko. The division transferred westward to fight in the Berlin Offensive on 28 March. The division crossed the Oder and fought near Stettin. During the Oder crossing, 118th Guards Rifle Regiment deputy battalion commander Captain Alexey Nemkov distinguished himself and was awarded the title Hero of the Soviet Union and the Order of Lenin on 29 June. A company commander from the same regiment, Senior lieutenant Alexander Nikolayev, was awarded the title Hero of the Soviet Union and the Order of Lenin on the same day as Nemkov for distinguishing himself during the Oder crossing. By 10 May 1945 the division was part of 18th Rifle Corps, 65th Army. By the end of the war, the division had reached Rostock. On 4 June, the division was awarded the Order of Bogdan Khmelnitsky 2nd class for its actions during the Berlin offensive.

Postwar 

On 1 December 1945, the division was converted into the 27th Guards Mechanized Division in the area of Strzegom and Świebodzice as part of the 7th Mechanized Army. It was reduced to a regiment on 1 December 1946 but became a division again on 30 October 1949. On 20 May 1957, it was converted to the 39th Guards Tank Division in Polotsk. On 11 January 1965, it was renamed the 37th Guards Tank Division. Between September and November 1964, the division conducted trials on Objet 432 initial production models of the T-64 tank. During the Cold War, the division was maintained at 25% strength. The 261st Tank Regiment was replaced by the 38th Guards Tank Regiment of the 34th Tank Division and the 936th Anti-Aircraft Missile Regiment was replaced by the 740th from the 3rd Guards Tank Division in November 1989. In March 1992, the division was taken over by Belarus. It was downsized and became a weapons and equipment storage base, then the 37th Separate Guards Mechanized Brigade by 2005, when the 30th Separate Mechanized Battalion joined the brigade. The 37th Brigade was disbanded in the fall of 2011, and the 30th Battalion transferred to the 19th Guards Mechanized Brigade. The brigade became the 37th Weapons and Equipment Storage Base, part of the Belorussian Northwestern Operational Command.

Commanders 
Division commanders included:
 Major General Viktor Zholudev (6 August 1942 – 8 April 1943)
 Colonel Timofey Naumovich Wisniewski (9 April – 7 June 1943)
 Colonel (promoted to Major General 25 September 1943) Evgeny Grigoryevich Ushakov (8 June 1943 – 29 April 1944)
 Colonel Ivan Brushko (November 1943)
 Major General Josef Sankowski (November 1943)
 Colonel (promoted to Major General 2 November 1944) Vasily Lavrentyvich Morozov (30 April – 15 November 1944)
 Major General Sobir Rakhimov (16 November 1944 – 26 March 1945) KIA
 Colonel Nikolai Onoprienko (28–29 March 1945)
 Major General Kuzma Grebennik (30 March – 9 May 1945)

Composition 
The 37th Guards Rifle Division was composed of the following units.
 109th Guards Rifle Regiment
 114th Guards Rifle Regiment
 118th Guards Rifle Regiment
 86th Guards Artillery Regiment
 42nd Guards Separate Antitank Battalion
 50th Guards Antiaircraft Battery (up to 15 April 1943)
 40th Guards Separate Reconnaissance Company
 39th Guards Sapper Battalion
In 1988, the 37th Guards Tank Division included the following units.
 252nd Tank Regiment
 261st Tank Regiment
 263rd Guards Tank Regiment
 298th Guards Motorized Rifle Regiment
 854th Guards Artillery Regiment
 936th Antiaircraft Missile Regiment
 199th Separate Missile Battalion
 55th Separate Reconnaissance Battalion
 359th Separate Guards Engineer-Sapper Battalion
 63rd Separate Guards Communications Battalion
 Separate Chemical Defence Company
 Separate Medical Battalion
 1020th Separate Material Supply Battalion

Notes

References
 Volostnov, Nikolay. На огненных рубежах (On the borders of fire) (3rd edition). Moscow: Voenizdat, 1983

Further reading 
 Dorokhov, Alexander Mikhailovich.  Прошу слова... (Request to Speak). Moscow: INES, 2007
 Gulyakin, Mikhail Filippovich. «Будет жить!..» (It will live!). Moscow: Voenizdat, 1985
 Volostnov, N.I., "Гвардия в огне" (roughly 'Guards in the Fire'), 3rd Edition, Gorki, 1979.

G037
Military units and formations established in 1942
Military units and formations disestablished in 1945
Military units and formations awarded the Order of the Red Banner